Ella Roberts is an Australian rules footballer playing for the West Coast Eagles in the AFL Women's (AFLW). Roberts was recruited by the Eagles with the 14th pick in the 2022 AFL Women's draft.

Early career
Roberts played in a premiership with WAFL Women's (WAFLW) club Peel Thunder, kicking two goals in the grand final, and was named the most valuable player at the 2021 AFL Women's Under-19 Championships.

AFL Women's career
Despite being drafted for her key forward prowess, Roberts was played primarily as a midfielder in her debut season, debuting for the Eagles in the opening round of season seven.

Statistics
Updated to the end of S7 (2022).

|-
| S7 (2022) ||  || 4
| 10 || 2 || 2 || 74 || 60 || 134 || 35 || 29 || 0.2 || 0.2 || 7.4 || 6.0 || 13.4 || 3.5 || 2.9 || 
|- class=sortbottom
! colspan=3 | Career
! 10 !! 2 !! 2 !! 74 !! 60 !! 134 !! 35 !! 29 !! 0.2 !! 0.2 !! 7.4 !! 6.0 !! 13.4 !! 3.5 !! 2.9 !! 
|}

Honours and achievements
 AFL Women's Rising Star nominee: S7

References

External links
 
 Ella Roberts at AustralianFootball.com
 

2004 births
Living people
West Coast Eagles (AFLW) players
Australian rules footballers from Western Australia